Banič, Banić is a surname. Notable people with the surname include:

Marko Banić (born 1984), Croatian basketball player
Štefan Banič (1870–1941), Slovak inventor

See also
25864 Banič, a main-belt asteroid

Slavic-language surnames